March 16 – Eastern Orthodox liturgical calendar - March 18

All fixed commemorations below are observed on March 30 by Orthodox Churches on the Old Calendar (until March 30, 2099).

For March 17, Orthodox Churches on the Old Calendar commemorate the Saints listed on March 4.

Saints

 Saint Lazarus the Righteous (Lazarus the Just), the friend of Christ (1st century)
 Martyr Marinus of Caesarea, soldier, at Caesarea in Palestine (262)  (see also: August 7)
 Saint Ambrose, Deacon, disciple of St. Didymus the Blind of Alexandria (400)
 Venerable Alexios the Man of God, in Rome (411)  (see also July 17 - West)
 Monk-martyr Paul of Cyprus, burned alive by iconoclasts (c. 760)
 Monk-martyr Paul of Crete, defender of icons, burned alive under Constantine V Copronymus (767)
 Venerable Theosterictus the Confessor, Abbot of Pelekete monastery near Prusa (826)

Pre-Schism Western saints

 Martyrs Alexander and Theodore, early martyrs in Rome.
 Venerable Patrick, Bishop of Armagh and the Enlightener of Ireland (461)
 Saint Llinio of Llandinam, Abbot and Founder of Llandinam, Powys, Wales (520)
 Saint Agricola (Agrele, Aregle), ascetic and Bishop of Châlon-sur-Saône in France (580)
 Saint Gertrude of Nivelles, Abbess of Nivelles, patroness of travellers (659)
 Saint Beccan of Rhum (677)
 Saint Withburga, Princess of East Anglia, hermitess whose holy well is at East Dereham (c. 743) (see also July 8)

Post-Schism Orthodox saints

 Venerable Macarius, Abbot and Wonderworker of Kalyazin (1483)
 Venerable Hieromartyr Gabriel the Lesser, of Gareji, Georgia (1802)
 Hieromartyr Theodoulos the Sinaite (1822)
 Saint Parthenius of the Kiev Caves (1855)
 Saint Gurias, Archbishop of Tauria and Simferopol (1882)

New martyrs and confessors

 New Hieromartyr Alexander Polivanov of Krasnoyarsk, Priest (1919)
 New Hieromartyr Victor Kiranov of Berdyansk, Protopresbyter of Simferopol-Crimea (1942)

Other commemorations

 Commemoration of the Great Earthquake of 790 AD, under Emperor Constantine VI.
 Repose of Lulach, last Orthodox King of Scotland (1058)
 Repose of Archbishop Tikhon (Troitsky) of San Francisco (1963)

Icon gallery

Notes

References

Sources
 March 17/March 30. Orthodox Calendar (PRAVOSLAVIE.RU).
 March 30 / March 17. HOLY TRINITY RUSSIAN ORTHODOX CHURCH (A parish of the Patriarchate of Moscow).
 March 17. OCA - The Lives of the Saints.
 The Autonomous Orthodox Metropolia of Western Europe and the Americas (ROCOR). St. Hilarion Calendar of Saints for the year of our Lord 2004. St. Hilarion Press (Austin, TX). p. 22.
 March 17. Latin Saints of the Orthodox Patriarchate of Rome.
 The Roman Martyrology. Transl. by the Archbishop of Baltimore. Last Edition, According to the Copy Printed at Rome in 1914. Revised Edition, with the Imprimatur of His Eminence Cardinal Gibbons. Baltimore: John Murphy Company, 1916. pp. 15–16.
Greek Sources
 Great Synaxaristes:  17 ΜΑΡΤΙΟΥ. ΜΕΓΑΣ ΣΥΝΑΞΑΡΙΣΤΗΣ.
  Συναξαριστής. 17 Μαρτίου. ECCLESIA.GR. (H ΕΚΚΛΗΣΙΑ ΤΗΣ ΕΛΛΑΔΟΣ). 
Russian Sources
  30 марта (17 марта). Православная Энциклопедия под редакцией Патриарха Московского и всея Руси Кирилла (электронная версия). (Orthodox Encyclopedia - Pravenc.ru).
  17 марта (ст.ст.) 30 марта 2013 (нов. ст.). Русская Православная Церковь Отдел внешних церковных связей. (DECR).

March in the Eastern Orthodox calendar